Haacht is a railway station in Haacht, Flemish Brabant, Belgium. The station opened in 1837 on the Line 53 (Mechelen - Leuven).

Train services
The station is served by the following services:

Intercity services (IC-21) Ghent - Dendermonde - Mechelen - Leuven (weekdays)
Local services (L-20) Sint-Niklaas – Mechelen – Leuven (weekdays)
Local services (L-20) Mechelen - Leuven (weekends)

Bus services
These bus services depart from the bus stops outside the station. They are operated by De Lijn.

270 (Brussels - Haacht - Keerbergen) (an electrical tram service until 1953 and probably later)
284 (Mechelen - Boortmeerbeek - Haacht - Leuven)
470 (Brussels Noord - Haacht Express)
660 (Zaventem, Brussels Airport - Haacht - Bonheiden)
700 (Haacht - Kampenhout - Boortmeerbeek) Taxibus

References

External links
belgianrail.be
De Lijn website

Railway stations in Belgium
Railway stations in Flemish Brabant